Andernach is a town in the district of Mayen-Koblenz, in Rhineland-Palatinate, Germany, of about 30,000 inhabitants.

A few hundred metres downstream of Andernach the Rhine valley narrows from both sides forming the northern part of the romantic Middle Rhine stretch. Already in Roman times the place the narrow passage begins was named "Porta Antunnacensis" or Andernachian Gate. It is formed by two hills, the Krahnenberg  (engl. Crane hill)  and the Engwetter (Narrow weather) on the right bank near the wine village Leutesdorf (external town district of Bad Hönningen). The crane hill is named after the old crane beneath his foot (see below); in earlier times (until 1650) the hill was named "Geiersberg" ("Vulture's hill").

After World War II it was the site of two Rheinwiesenlager temporary prison camps.

The town

Local dialect
As with most German cities, towns and villages, Andernach has its own local dialect – the "Andernacher Platt" ("Andernachian dialect") in which "Andernach" and the local dialect itself is named "Annenach" and "Annenache Platt". It belongs to the Moselle Franconian language subgroup and considerably differs from High German, e. g. the Rhine river is named "Rhein"  in High German (pronounced similar to English "Rhine" except for the "r"), but "Rhäin"  in the dialect; except for the "r", it sounds similar to English "rain" with a stretched "a". Another examples are words like "Wind" (engl. wind) and "Winter" (engl. winter), which is "Weend" and "Weende" in the dialect. The double "ee" is pronounced like French "é". Unlike other dialects in the surrounding places the Andernachian dialect is strongly relative to the Ripuarian dialect due its connection to Cologne. For more examples see the German Wikipedia site.

Coat of arms and town seal
The coat of arms of Andernach known since 1344 (the colours appeared first in 1483) shows a black cross on a white escutcheon (shield) charged with a pair of X-shapedly arranged red keys. It is described in heraldic language as Argent a cross sable charged with keys in saltire gules.

The black cross on silver symbolizes the governance of the Electorate of Cologne; the keys refer to St. Peter the patron saint of the Archbishopric of Trier (and of the cathedral of Trier), of which Andernach formed part. The red (key) colour adverts to the red cross (on silver) in the coat of arms of the Electorate of Trier.

The oldest town seal shows St. Mary sitting on a throne with a church in her right hand and with the left hand holding a town. The seal inscription says: MATER DEI PATRONA CIVIUM ANDERNACENSIUM – Mother of God, patron saint of the Andernachian citizens. The oldest seal was made before 1200, the oldest seal impression dates from the year 1250.

Description
Founded by the Romans as Antunnacum in 12 BC on the site of an old Celtic settlement probably called Antunnuac, Andernach is one of the oldest towns in Germany which as such held its "Bimillenary feast" in 1988.  Both the Roman and the Celtic names mean "village or farm of Antunnos/us"—a man not yet identified.  It was the southernmost outpost of the Electorate of Cologne from the 12th to the 19th century. In addition to the touristically appealing medieval remnants of the old town fortifications, the city of Andernach is the location of several old industrial plants such as a huge malt mill (the last one of more than ten mills and breweries from the 19th and 20th centuries dismantled in 2008). In the 19th century the town was noted for the production of millstones, bricks and clay for making tobacco pipes. Among the more modern of its industrial / manufacturing base is a large steel-mill to produce cold formed tin plate and companies manufacturing medicinal products, raw food materials, cast iron products, engines and engine parts.
"Der Runde Turm") finished in 1453, the archiepiscopal (Electorate of Cologne) castle ruins with a well-preserved keep, and the remains of the town wall with several well-restored wall towers and two gates: the "Rhine Gate" (das "Rheintor") built around 1200 as the "Grain Gate" (die "Kornpforte"; last renovation and reconstruction in 1899 after 17th century plans) and the "Coblencian Gate" ("Koblenzer Tor"), originally called the "Castle Gate" ("Burgpforte"); in medieval and Renaissance times up to the 19th century the German word "Pforte" (from Latin "porta") was used for town and church gates instead of "Tor".

For 350 years it was in operation from 1561 to 1911. This treadwheel crane with stone walls (most cranes had a timber housing) is one of only a few of its kind in Europe to have survived. A prince-electoral order or permission was needed to build and operate such a crane in the times of the Holy Roman Empire.

The Catholic "St. Mary Assumption Parish Church" locally known as "Church of Our Lady" or "St. Mary's Cathedral" (Ger. "Pfarrkirche Maria Himmelfahrt", "Liebfrauenkirche", or "Mariendom") is the oldest historical attraction in Andernach, some of which date back to the 11th century.

The town palais "von der Leyen house" (Ger. "Haus von der Leyen"), named after its builder district magistrate and governor of the prince-elector, "Georg III von der Leyen," dates back to 1600. Built in renaissance and baroque styles it now houses the town museum since 1936 and again since 1969. It displays among others a fine model of the Roman "castrum" Antunnacum, a 17th-century town model in ~1:600 scale and a thoroughly assembled model (~1:90) of the prince-electoral town castle.

One of Andernach's natural attractions is the world's highest (max. ) cold-water geyser, driven by carbon dioxide with force generated in a fashion similar to that in a shaken bottle of table water. It is located a little less than half a mile downstream from the "Crane" in the Nature Reserve of "Namedyer Werth" (MHG for "island of Namedy") now a peninsula. Activated for the first time in 1903, the geyser was shut down in 1957 but reactivated early in the current century as yet another city attraction.

Jewish history
In the 12th century, Benjamin of Tudela described Andernach as one of the 13 on the Rhine with important Jewish communities. Jewish residents in Andernach were first mentioned in the Köln archives in 1255. The Jewish community was periodically persecuted during the 13th to 15th centuries. On 3 August 1287 Archbishop Siegfried II of Westerburg issued a protection decree for the town Jews from the local Burghers. Persecutions occurred especially during the 14th century by the Arnold von Uissigheim "Armleder" persecutions and in 1348–1349, as a result of the Black Death Jewish persecutions. It appears as if between the 15th and the 19th centuries no Jews lived in Andernach. In 1860, a new Jewish community was founded in Andernach. Its cemetery, dated to 1888, is part of the city cemetery on KoblenzerStrasse.
On Kristallnacht in 1938, the town synagogue was set on fire and most of the young men were taken to Dachau. At least 11 Jews who used to live in Andernach were murdered during the Holocaust, and no Jews lived in Andernach after 1945.
Several sites commemorate the history of Jewish community of Andernach. An ancient Jewish Mikveh, dated to the 13th century, is one of the oldest ones in Europe and can be found under the old town house, built in the 16th century close to the site where the synagogue stood. The Mikveh can be visited.

Population development

Lord Mayors
Till 1969 the Lord Mayor was named Mayor.

 1946–1948: Egon Herfeldt (CDP, later FWG)
 1949–1964: Johann Füth (CDU)
 1965–1974: Walter Steffens (CDU)
 1974–1994: Gerold Küffmann (CDU)
 since 1994: Achim Hütten (born 1957), (SPD)

Mayors
 1965–1975: Werner Klein (SPD) (1928–1985)
 1975–1982: Helmuth Günter (CDU)
 1983–1993: Rainer Krämer (SPD)
 1993–1994: Achim Hütten (SPD)
 1994–2002: Franz Breil (FWG)
 2002–2010: Josef Nonn (CDU)
 since 2010: Claus Peitz (CDU)

Literature
Honoré de Balzac places his short story L'Auberge rouge in Andernach. It is also the birthplace of twentieth century American author Charles Bukowski.

Music
The Dutch folk song "T'Andernaken" (In Andernach) was very popular all over western Europe in the 15th/16th century and set to music by numerous composers of the period such as Obrecht, Brumel, King Henry VIII, Agricola, Hofhaimer, Senfl.

Places of interest
The famous Lake Laach (Ger. "Laacher See", literally "'Laachian' or 'Laky' Lake", i.e. "Lacustrine Lake" or "Lake of the Lake", comparable to the naming of "Loch Lochy" in Scotland) is the largest maar-like lake in the Eifel (more precisely a water-filled caldera) and has a 12th-century Benedictine monastery. Südliche Voreifel or Vordereifel, the south-eastern forelands of the Eifel).

Namedy Castle is situated in a village on the Rhine, adjacent to Andernach in north-western direction. In 1909 it was purchased by Prince Karl Anton of Hohenzollern and his wife Princess Joséphine Caroline of Belgium. Today it is managed by their grandsons' widow, Princess Heide of Hohenzollern, housing concerts, theatre plays, art exhibitions, dinners and other events.

Andernach mirror container
During World War II, a transit camp for the Nazi Euthanasia Action T4 victims was active in town. The institute in Andernach sent mentally ill patients and disabled people to the Hadamar Euthanasia Centre, where victims were murdered. Between 1941 and 1944, about 1,560 people were sent to Hadamar through the Andernach transit hospital. In 1996, a memorial was built at the city center, commemorating the victims. The interior of the memorial is lined with mirrors on which the names of the known victims are engraved. 400 other dots stand for victims whose names are unknown.

Infrastructure
Andernach station is on the Left Rhine line and the Eifelquer Railway. It is served by InterCity, Regional-Express (the Rhein-Express, at hourly intervals) and Regionalbahn services (MittelrheinBahn, at hourly intervals) operating between Cologne and Koblenz. It is also served by Regionalbahn on the Eifelquer Railway to Kaisersesch at hourly intervals.

Twin towns – sister cities

Andernach is twinned with:

 Dimona, Israel
 Ekeren (Antwerp), Belgium
 Farnham, England, United Kingdom
 Saint-Amand-les-Eaux, France
 Stockerau, Austria
 Zella-Mehlis, Germany

Notable people
Johann Winter von Andernach (1505–1574), humanist physician
Adolf Kolping (1909–1997), Catholic theologian, university professor
Charles Bukowski (1920–1994), poet and writer
Puig Aubert (1925–1994), French rugby league footballer
Hans Belting (1935–2023), art historian and media theorist
Ralf Walter (born 1958), politician (SPD), Member of the European Parliament 1994–2009
David Wagner (born 1971), writer
Christian Sturm (born 1978), opera and concert singer
Daniel Bauer (born 1982), footballer
Markus Pazurek (born 1988), footballer
Stefan Bell (born 1991), footballer

Associated with Andernach
Inge Helten (born 1950), athlete (sprinter) of the DJK Andernach up to 1971, 1976 100-metre world record, as well as silver and bronze at the Olympic Games 1976 
Stephan Ackermann (born 1963), theologian, made 1981 his abitur at the Kurfürst-Salentin-Gymnasium, since 2009 Bishop of Trier

See also
 Andernach chess

References

External links
Coat of arms of Andernach

Populated places on the Rhine
Mayen-Koblenz
Districts of the Rhine Province
Holocaust locations in Germany
Middle Rhine